Anders Konrad Svante Gernandt (18 July 1916 – 23 August 2008) was a Swedish politician. He was a member of the Centre Party.

References

This article was initially translated from the Swedish Wikipedia article.

Centre Party (Sweden) politicians
1916 births
2008 deaths